Kristian Rommen is a Norwegian sport shooter who has won the IPSC Norwegian Rifle Championship 7 times, and was for a longer period coach for the IPSC Norwegian national rifle team.

References

DSSN Hall of Fame
TriggerFreeze.com - IPSC Rifle Norway

Year of birth missing (living people)
Living people
Place of birth missing (living people)
IPSC shooters
Norwegian male sport shooters